Below is a sortable list of individuals who died as a result of running a marathon.

Causes of death during the marathon 
The most frequent causes are:
 sudden cardiac death, triggered by a congenital or acquired heart disorder;
 exercise-associated hyponatremia or other electrolyte imbalance;
 exertional heat stroke or severe hyperthermia.
The age distribution ranges widely, from the teens through the sixties.

In 2016, a systematic medical review found that the risk of sudden cardiac death during or immediately after a marathon was between 0.6 and 1.9 deaths per 100,000 participants, varying across the specific studies and the methods used, and not controlling for age or gender. This translates to a few published marathon deaths worldwide in a typical year, although the authors lamented the lack of a central registry for the information.

The second major risk arises from imbalanced fluid or electrolyte levels, particularly hyponatremia (sodium deficiency, overhydration, or water intoxication). As a marathon medical director described the counter-intuitive and under-publicized risk in 2005: "There are no reported cases of dehydration causing death in the history of world running, but there are plenty of cases of people dying of hyponatremia."

Heat stroke is an emergency condition in which thermoregulation fails and the body temperature rises above . It becomes a greater risk in warm and humid weather.

List

Non-health-related marathon disasters

See also
 Boston Marathon bombing (2013)

References

Further reading
 Burfoot, Amby. "Are marathons dangerous?", Runner's World, 3 November 2008.
 English, Joe. "Why do runners die during marathons?", Running-Advice.com, 13 March 2008.
 Noakes, Tim. "Waterlogged: The Serious Problem of Overhydration in Endurance Sports", Human Kinetics, 2012. .

Marathon fatalities
Marathon
Fatalities
Marathon